Imagi Animation Studios, also known as Imagi Studios, was a Chinese animation and visual effects studio based in Hong Kong, and  established in 2000 by Imagi International Holdings Limited, a Hong Kong-based investment company.

Background
In 2000, Imagi Animation Studios was set up and production starts on its first project, the CGI-animated television series Zentrix. The company had a studio in Chai Wan, Hong Kong, as well as a creative development and production facility in Los Angeles, California and a satellite office in Tokyo.

The company's first CGI-animated theatrical film TMNT was released on March 23, 2007 by Warner Bros. in the United States and Canada, opening No. 1 at the box office, and was being distributed internationally by the Weinstein Company. Imagi's focus was to create high-quality CGI-animated feature films with superhero themes to entertain global audiences, combining Hollywood storytelling with computer animation done in Hong Kong.

Setbacks and bankruptcy
In January 2009, Imagi's auditing firm announced that the studio lacked funding to complete the release of Cat Tale (which was to have been released by Metro-Goldwyn-Mayer) and Gatchaman and art director Felix Ip reported that Gatchaman'''s release was not expected until later in 2009. In June 2009, Imagi opened Gatchaman to licensing partners and announced a 3-D theatrical release for 2011. In October 2009, Imagi released Astro Boy, based on the manga series of the same name, the film was a box-office bomb, losing the company $23 million in the process.

In January 2010, Imagi's Hong Kong based parent company Imagi International Holdings Limited announced that the Gatchaman project will be "delivered in 100% Stereoscopic 3-D" and that in order to safeguard working capital, it closed its United States subsidiaries. This closure was finalized in late January with the layoff of approximately 30 staffers and the retaining of a few key personnel who will continue to work as consultants as Imagi seeks $30 million from investors to continue its animation projects.

On February 5, 2010, following the financial failure of Astro Boy'', Imagi Animation Studios filed for bankruptcy and was sold to Brad Foxhoven. The sale was completed in May 2010.

Works

Theatrical feature films

Television/Direct-to-video films

Short films

TV series

Cancelled films

References

External links
 Official website

Hong Kong animation studios
Mass media companies established in 2000
Mass media companies disestablished in 2010
Companies listed on the Hong Kong Stock Exchange